The women's tournament of football at the 2015 Summer Universiade will be held from July 2 to 12 in Gwangju, South Korea.

Teams

Preliminary round

Group A

Group B

Group C

Group D

Classification round

Quarterfinal round

9th–16th place

Semifinal round

13th–16th place

9th–12th place

Elimination round

Quarterfinals

Semifinals

5th–8th place

1st–4th place

Final round
All of the following matches will be held on July 13, 2015. Only the gold medal match will need 30 minutes extra time if two teams draw. Other matches will go directly to penalty shoot-outs  if the two teams tie.

13th place match

11th place match

9th place match

7th place match

5th place match

Bronze medal match

Gold medal match

Final standings

References

External links
Official Website

football
2015
Women
2015 in South Korean women's sport
2015 in women's association football